Ormetica sypilus is a moth of the family Erebidae first described by Pieter Cramer in 1777. It is found in Suriname, Brazil, Ecuador and French Guiana.

References

Moths described in 1777
Ormetica
Arctiinae of South America